Harez Arian Habib (born 20 February 1982, in Kabul) is an Afghan footballer who plays for KSV Klein-Karben.

Club career stats
Last update: 10 September 2011

International career
Habib plays in midfield and scored his first two national team goals for Afghanistan in SAFF 2008 opener against the Hosts Sri Lanka, he scored one goal each against Bangladesh and Bhutan to be the top scorers in the tournament.

International goals

External links
 
 Harez Habib at Fupa.net 
 
 

Afghan footballers
1982 births
Living people
Footballers from Kabul
Afghan emigrants to Germany
Association football midfielders
Afghanistan international footballers